The canton of Uzerche is an administrative division of the Corrèze department, south-central France. Its borders were modified at the French canton reorganisation which came into effect in March 2015. Its seat is in Uzerche.

It consists of the following communes:
 
Arnac-Pompadour
Benayes
Beyssac
Beyssenac
Condat-sur-Ganaveix
Espartignac
Eyburie
Lamongerie
Lubersac
Masseret
Meilhards
Montgibaud
Saint-Éloy-les-Tuileries
Saint-Julien-le-Vendômois
Saint-Martin-Sepert
Saint-Pardoux-Corbier
Saint-Sornin-Lavolps
Saint-Ybard
Salon-la-Tour
Ségur-le-Château
Uzerche

References

Cantons of Corrèze